Happy Wheels is a ragdoll physics-based platform browser game developed and published by Fancy Force. Created by video game designer Jim Bonacci in 2010, the game features several player characters, who use different, sometimes atypical, vehicles to traverse the game's many levels. The game is best known for its graphic violence and the amount of user-generated content its players produce on a regular basis, with game maps shared on a public server. A sequel was announced to be in development since 2019.

Gameplay 

Happy Wheels tagline is "Choose your inadequately prepared racer, and ignore severe consequences in your desperate search for victory!" The actual mechanics of gameplay vary because of character choice and level design; the game includes characters such as a businessman on a Segway.

The goal of the game also differs depending on the level. In most levels, the goal is to reach a finish line or to collect tokens. Many levels feature alternate or nonexistent goals for the player.

Reviewers have noted that Happy Wheels exhibits graphic violence in its gameplay. For instance, characters can be decapitated, shot, or crushed by different obstacles. Loss of limbs and animated blood loss are also graphic elements.

Players also have the choice to upload instant replays of their level attempts, which can then be viewed.

Happy Wheels features a level editor, which allows players to create custom levels of their own. It contains a plethora of tools and objects for level building. Users can upload their maps to a public server where they are accessible.

Development 
Indie game developer Jim Bonacci, largely the programmer and artist for the game, began work on the game in 2006. Bonacci has said that his inspiration for the game came from other ragdoll physics-based games in the browser games community, as his friend and former boss, Alec Cove, had made a Verlet physics engine for flash. Bonacci said that "[he] was messing around with it, and eventually created a guy in a wheelchair that would endlessly fall down a random hill. [He] thought it was funny and stupid, so [he] kept expanding on it. It was only meant to be a very small game, but eventually it became [his] main focus."

In addition, he explained the violent nature of the game in terms of his frustration with how consequences of certain actions were not treated realistically in other game titles, as he stated that "it always bothered [him] when... you'd fall off your vehicle and harmlessly bounce around. In other cases, you would have the same canned animation over and over. [He's] not sure if it was a lack of detail or concern on the part of the developer, but the consequences of your in-game actions were often improperly illustrated. For [him], half of the fun of playing a game that imitates life (sort of), is making mistakes and seeing the end result."

Bonacci also noted that, because gameplay would often involve the player dying repeatedly, he put a great deal of effort into making that part of the game enjoyable.

The full version of Happy Wheels is only available on Bonacci's original website, and demo versions of the game are licensed to other websites. These demo versions only include a limited number of featured maps and selectable characters.

There are approximately 5 million user-generated levels. The total count of level plays is over 13 billion.

Currently, Jason Schymick helps Bonacci work on the game programming, although different people have contributed. "The others who helped are all amazing", says Bonacci. Alec Cove joined Fancy Force in 2013 and handles all server-side architecture and development.

On September 30, 2014, Schymick announced that iOS and Android ports of the game have been in development. The iOS version was released as a free download through the App Store on August 20, 2015. For the Android version, Fancy Force began accepting beta test applications in October 2019. Following a beta testing phase, the finished version was released on January 25, 2020.

On January 9, 2020, Bonacci posted on his website that a JavaScript port by Goodboy Digital was in development and the game will continue to function after Adobe Flash ends at the end of 2020. Eleven months later, on December 28, 2020, the JavaScript port was released, continuing the existence of the game after the end of Flash.

Reception 

Happy Wheels has received generally positive reviews. It was recommended by GameSetWatch and considered one of the "Best Free Games" by IGN. Its level editor and amount of user-generated content have received praise from reviewers. The over-the-top nature of the violence is a central theme of the game, and some reviewers have considered it humorous; one review stated that "It is so genuinely difficult to play Happy Wheels and not just laugh and laugh at the ridiculous ways in which your character can be torn into pieces."

References

External links 
 

2010 video games
Android (operating system) games
Browser games
IOS games
Platform games
Video games developed in the United States